Ruos Chea Jivit  (in Khmer: រស់ជាតិជិវិត in English: Taste of Life) is a Cambodian medical drama series and soap opera.

History 
It was created and produced by Matthew Robinson, a former director and producer/executive producer of the BBC television series Byker Grove and EastEnders, and its production costs were met by the United Kingdom's Department for International Development as part of a £3 million plan to combat the spread of HIV/Aids and decrease infant mortality in Cambodia, a country with the highest infection rates in South-East Asia and where a third of all children were dead before their fifth birthday.

It was the first-ever Khmer production to use actual voice without dubbing. The series began a trend in Cambodian films of using actors' real voices without being dubbed.

References

Cambodian television soap operas
2000s Cambodian television series
Cambodian Television Network original programming